Wurm Online is a 3D massively multiplayer online video game (MMO) developed by Code Club AB (formerly known as Oneto free AB, and Mojang Specifications) in Motala, Sweden. Development started in 2003 by friends Rolf Jansson and Markus Persson, and it was released for personal computers using Java in 2006. Both players versus players and realm versus realm combat are possible in the game.

Gameplay
 
Wurm Online is a sandbox MMO game. Players can construct buildings such as walls and houses, mine and gather resources to craft tools, terraform the land, tunnel underground, and perform other sandbox actions. There are multiple servers to play on, each an island separated from the others by a sea that can be crossed. Players can create and join villages and alliances with other players, and form kingdoms on the Player vs. Player servers to conquer land and fight for glory.

There is a crafting and skill system, where in order to craft an item, the player must have the required skill and items, however, the player's skill level and the quality of the items used affect the time it takes to craft and the quality of the resulting item. Wurm Online has hundreds of skills, ranging from carpentry and smithery to specific tool and weapons skills, and even religion stats, allowing for a wide range of specialization and therefore industries to emerge where players can co-operate with each other to achieve goals and complete projects.

The game also has a religious system, where one can choose to worship one of a handful of gods and gain bonuses and the ability to cast spells based on that god and their devotion to them. The player's favor with their god can be increased by participating in missions regarding that god. On PvP servers, there are many kingdoms, some created by the players, that are constantly rising and falling as players raid enemy settlements and claim land for their kingdom. As a result, the game has a rich history that can be seen and learned from by playing the game and engaging with other players.

Development

Wurm is developed in Java and uses OpenGL for rendering the game. The development of the game was started by Rolf Jansson and Markus Persson. Wurm first started its Beta stage in 2003 and had its official release in 2006. In 2007, Markus Persson left the company. When asked if Wurm would shut down due to his resignation, Markus said "Wurm'''s not going anywhere." In 2008, the main developer began publishing a blog.

In 2011, the main developer hired their first paid employee, a client developer who has since been responsible for an overhaul of the lighting system. This was later followed by a lead artist being hired by the developer, resulting in a total of two known employees as of July 2011. The game was officially released in 2012.

On 21 October 2015, a standalone version of Wurm Online, known as Wurm Unlimited, was released. It contains the same gameplay (with variable rules), but is a one-time purchase rather than having a limited free trial and monthly fee, and is played on player-run servers instead of the main official servers.

Reception
Massively.com has, since 2012, begun regularly featuring Wurm, often doing live streams of the game and regularly posting news updates about Wurm. Massively have often praised Wurm for its no-limit freedom and for truly being a "sandbox" MMO with many different skills and abilities, criticizing only the "maintenance mode" that occurs when maintaining a (large) deed/village.

Tisthammer examined it in a "First Impressions" review. The distant landscapes were highlighted for their photographic quality, and the main appeal was seen in the interactivity of the world. However, overall, it failed to keep the reviewer's attention, feeling that MUD-style text-based combat has been eclipsed by modern MMORPGs.

A PC Gamer review after the official release was critical, with a score of 68%, citing the time commitment required as well as the lack of creativity in what a player could accomplish.

Christopher Steele of Topfreemmorpg.net praised Wurm Online's gameplay and noted that it "provides a true challenge to the players."

MMO Sandboxes' reviewer Crescent Wolf described it as a "true sandbox title" and that "if you ever wanted to experience how a true sandbox game looks like here you have it."

References

Further reading
 Jordan Hall, Wurm Online 1.0 Review, OnRPG.com, 28 December 2012
 Benjy Ikimi, Wurm Online Review, gamezine.co.uk, 13 Aug 2009
  Sascha "Hugin" Wall, Wurm Online. Auf den Spuren der letzten Trapper'', onlinewelten.com, 20 July 2008

External links
 

2006 video games
Active massively multiplayer online games
Browser games
Java platform games
Indie video games
Massively multiplayer online role-playing games
Video games designed by Markus Persson
Video games developed in Sweden